{{DISPLAYTITLE:C16H10N2Na2O7S2}}
The molecular formula C16H10N2Na2O7S2 (molar mass: 452.369 g/mol) may refer to:

 Orange G
 Orange GGN
 Sunset Yellow FCF

Molecular formulas